Bos en Lommer (English: Wood and Shade) is a neighborhood of Amsterdam, Netherlands. From 1990 to 2010 it was considered a district of the municipality of Amsterdam in the province of North Holland. As of May 1, 2010, it was merged into the new Amsterdam-West borough.

Geographically the district lies west of the historical city center of Amsterdam. On the north side it is bordered by the Haarlemmerweg and Westerpark, and on its south side it is bordered by the Jan van Galenstraat. The eastern areas of the districts is known for hosting the 'Centrale Markthallen'.

Neighbourhoods of Amsterdam
Former boroughs of Amsterdam